Kwanza is a town in Trans-Nzoia County in western Kenya, close to the international border with Uganda. It is the headquarters of Kwanza Ward, one  of the constituent wards in Kwanza Constituency.

Location
The geographical coordinates of Kwanza are: 01°09'51.0"N, 35°00'00.0"E (Latitude:1.1641; Longitude:35.0000).

Overview
As of June 2018, Kwanza Constituency lacked a tarmacked road, with residents using donkeys to "transport produce from farms to markets". The planned tarmacking of the Kitale–Namanjalala–Keriget–Chepchoina Road, is expected to boost agriculture in the community, as it will ease the transport of agricultural produce to the market, post-harvest. The  road, is expected to cost US$20 million to upgrade to grade II tarmac, with drainage culverts and shoulders. The contract has been awarded to China National Aero-Technology International Engineering Corporation, with the government of Kenya funding the upgrade.

References

External links
Trans Nzoia County At A Glance As at 3 November 2011.

Populated places in Trans-Nzoia County